Noche de Campeones (Spanish for "Night of Champions") was a professional wrestling pay-per-view (PPV) event that was scripted and produced by the Mexican Lucha Libre AAA Worldwide (AAA) promotion on December 28, 2022, in Acapulco, Guerrero, Mexico at Arena GNP Seguros.

The event was themed around championship matches, with all but one of the matches being contested for a championship. In the main event match, Hijo del Vikingo defeated Bandido to retain the AAA Mega Championship. In other prominent matches, Arez defeated Taurus and Villano III Jr. in a three-way match to win the inaugural La Leyenda Azul Blue Demon Championship, Abismo Negro Jr. and Flammer defeated Komander and Sexy Star II and Octagón Jr. and Lady Shani in a three-way mixed tag team match to win the vacant AAA World Mixed Tag Team Championship, and Los Hermanos Lee (Dragon Lee and Dralístico) defeated FTR (Dax Harwood and Cash Wheeler) to win the AAA World Tag Team Championship, immediately after the match Los Hermanos Lee vacated the championship and Dragon Lee announced he had signed with WWE.

Production

Background
Noche de Campeones is themed around championship matches, with all but one of the announced matches on the card being contested for a championship.

The event aired on pay-per-view via the FITE TV service.

Storylines
Noche de Campeones featured seven professional wrestling matches that involved different wrestlers from pre-existing scripted feuds, plots and storylines. Wrestlers portrayed either heels (referred to as rudos in Mexico, those that portray the "bad guys") or faces (técnicos in Mexico, the "good guy" characters) as they followed a series of tension-building events, which culminated in wrestling matches.

Matches

See also
2022 in professional wrestling

References

2022 in professional wrestling
December 2022 events in Mexico
2022 in Mexico